Lamontville Golden Arrows F.C. are a South African soccer club based in Durban that plays in the Premier Soccer League.

History
It was founded in 1943 in the streets of Lamontville, a township in Durban. The club played in the defunct National Professional Soccer League in the 1970s until they were relegated in 1976. They played in the Second Division thereafter until 1980 when they were embroiled in a soccer scandal and thrown out of the National Professional Soccer League.

The team was formed again in 1996 when the Madlala family bought the Second Division franchise of Ntokozo FC and changed its name to Lamontville Golden Arrows.

In 2000 they won promotion to the PSL by winning the National First Division Coastal Stream.

Arrows claimed their first piece of major silverware when they won the 2009 MTN 8, routing Ajax Cape Town 6–0 in the final played at Orlando Stadium.

Honours
League
1999–2000 – National First Division Coastal Stream Champions (2nd tier)
2014–15 – National First Division (2nd tier)
Cups
2009 – MTN 8 Champions
Pre-season tournaments
2011 – KZN Premier's Cup

Club records
Most starts:  Thanduyise Khuboni 212 (2006–2014) (previous record, Ntsako Neverdie Makhubela 173 (2005–2011)
Most goals:  Mabhuti Khanyeza (2002–2007) 43
Most capped player:  Joseph Musonda, 108
Most starts in a season:  Thanduyise Khuboni, 35 (2011/12)
Most goals in a season:  Richard Henyekane 22 (2008/09)
Record victory: 6–0 vs Platinum Stars (18/3/09, PSL)
Record defeat: 0-6 vs Mamelodi Sundowns (12/04/2022, PSL)

Premier Soccer League record
2015/2016 – 9th
2013/2013 – 16th (relegated to National First Division)
2012/2013 – 13th
2011/2012 – 13th
2010/2011 – 11th
2009/2010 – 12th
2008/2009 – 5th
2007/2008 – 9th
2006/2007 – 12th
2005/2006 – 6th
2004/2005 – 9th
2003/2004 – 9th
2002/2003 – 5th
2001/2002 – 13th
2000/2001 – 9th

Club officials and technical team
Chairwoman:  Mato Madlala
Team manager:  Nonceba Madlala
Coach:  Mandla Ncikazi
Assistant coaches:  Mabhuti Khenyeza
Goalkeeper coach:  Majdi Mnsaira 
Physical trainer:  Pedro Picarro 
Physio:  Gareth Crankshaw

First team squad

Foreigners
In the South African PSL, only five non-South African nationals can be registered. Foreign players who have acquired permanent residency can be registered as locals. Namibians born before 1990 can be registered as South Africans.

 Limbikani Mzava
 Danny Phiri

permanent residency
 Chris Katjiukua
 Maximilian Mbaeva

Notable former coaches
 Jan Simulambo (2001)
 Khabo Zondo (8 Feb 2005 – 9 January 2007)
 Manqoba Mngqithi (10 Jan 2007 – 30 June 2010)
 Zoran Filipović (12 July 2010 – 21 March 2011)
 Ernst Middendorp (22 March 2011 – 30 September 2011)
 Muhsin Ertuğral (3 Oct 2011 – 22 October 2012)
 Manqoba Mngqithi (23 Oct 2012 – 5 October 2013)
 Mark Harrison (7 Oct 2013 – 10 February 2014)
 Shaun Bartlett (interim) (10 Feb 2014 – 30 June 2014)
 Shaun Bartlett (1 July 2014 – 15 June 2015)
 Serame Letsoaka (15 June 2015 – 1 December 2015)
 Clinton Larsen (6 Dec 2015 –27 Dec 2018)
 Steve Komphela (27 Dec 2018 )

Shirt sponsor and kit manufacturer
Shirt sponsor: None
Kit manufacturer: None

References

External links
 
Premier Soccer League
PSL Club Info
South African Football Association
Confederation of African Football

 
Association football clubs established in 1943
Premier Soccer League clubs
Soccer clubs in Durban
1943 establishments in South Africa
National First Division clubs